Jeffrey Taylor (January 1, 1960 – March 2020) was an American professional basketball player. He played for three years at Texas Tech University, before being drafted by the Houston Rockets in the 1982 NBA Draft. Taylor played one season with the Rockets in the 1982-83 NBA season, and another with the Detroit Pistons in the 1986-87 NBA season.

After his NBA career ended, he continued playing in Europe, eventually settling in Sweden. His son, Jeffery played college ball at Vanderbilt, and was selected in the 2012 NBA draft by the Charlotte Bobcats.

Taylor's death was announced by Texas Tech on March 5, 2020. No exact death date was given.

References

External links
Profile  —  TheDraftReview.com
Profile — Basketball-Reference.com

1960 births
2020 deaths
American emigrants to Sweden
American men's basketball players
Basketball players from Arkansas
Basketball players from New Mexico
Detroit Pistons players
Hobbs High School alumni
Houston Rockets draft picks
Houston Rockets players
People from Hobbs, New Mexico
People from Blytheville, Arkansas
Point guards
Shooting guards
Texas Tech Red Raiders basketball players
American expatriate basketball people in the Philippines
Great Taste Coffee Makers players
Philippine Basketball Association imports